Liopholis is a genus of skinks, lizards in the family Scincidae. Species of the genus are found in the Australian region. They were previously placed in the genus Egernia.

Description
Liopholis are smallish to largish-sized skinks. They have 34–52 rows of midbody scales; dorsal scales are usually smooth. The nasal scale has no postnarial groove; the subocular scale row is incomplete. The eyes are relatively large, and the eyelids usually have conspicuous cream-coloured margins.

Species
There are 12 recognized species:

Nota bene: A binomial authority in parentheses indicates that the species was originally described in a genus other than Liopholis.

References

Further reading
Fitzinger L (1843). Systema Reptilium, Fasciculus Primus, Amblyglossae. Vienna: Braumüller & Seidel. 106 pp. + indices. (Liopholis, new genus, p. 22). (in Latin).

 
Lizard genera
Taxa named by Leopold Fitzinger